Heavy Rotation may refer to:
 Heavy rotation, the repeated airing of a limited playlist of songs or music videos
 Heavy Rotation (Anastacia album)
 Heavy Rotation (JKT48 album)
 "Heavy Rotation" (song), a song by AKB48
 Heavy Rotation, a 2006 album by Deceptikonz
 "Heavy Rotation", a song by Ciara from Basic Instinct
 "Heavy Rotation", a song by Soul Asylum from Hang Time